Inderbir Singh Bolaria is an Indian politician and belongs to Indian national congress. He is a Chief Parliamentary Secretary (Education) of Punjab and member of Punjab Legislative Assembly and represent Amritsar South.

Family
He is son of Raminder Singh Bolaria, a former MLA from Amritsar South.

Political career
Bolaria was elected to Punjab Legislative Assembly in Amritsar South constituency by-election in 2008, which was vacated due to death of sitting MLA and his father Raminder Singh Bolaria. He was re-elected as MLA from this constituency in 2012 and Punjab Government made him a Chief Parliamentary Secretary (Education) of Punjab. He was re-elected in 2012. Bolaria was one of the 42 INC MLAs who submitted their resignation in protest of a decision of the Supreme Court of India ruling Punjab's termination of the Sutlej-Yamuna Link (SYL) water canal unconstitutional.

Electoral performance

References

Living people
Shiromani Akali Dal politicians
Indian Sikhs
Punjab, India MLAs 2007–2012
Punjab, India MLAs 2012–2017
Year of birth missing (living people)
People from Amritsar district
Place of birth missing (living people)
Punjab, India MLAs 2017–2022
Indian National Congress politicians from Punjab, India